Aslanbek Vitalievich Khushtov (born 1 July 1980 in Beloglinka, Kabardino-Balkarian ASSR) is a Circassian (Kabarday) wrestler, who has won a gold medal in the 2008 Summer Olympics. Khushtov is a member of the Parliament of Kabardino-Balkarian Republic of the 4th convocation.

References

External links
 

1980 births
Living people
People from Kabardino-Balkaria
Circassian people of Russia
Russian male sport wrestlers
Olympic wrestlers of Russia
Wrestlers at the 2008 Summer Olympics
Olympic gold medalists for Russia
Olympic medalists in wrestling
Medalists at the 2008 Summer Olympics
World Wrestling Championships medalists
European Wrestling Championships medalists
Sportspeople from Kabardino-Balkaria